Vasileiadis or Vas[s]iliadis is a Greek surname. It is a patronymic surname which literally means "the child of Vasileios". The feminine form is Vasileiadou or Vas[s]iliadou (Βασιλειάδου). Notable people with the surname include:

Aggelos Vassiliadis, Greek footballer
Georgia Vasileiadou (1897–1980), Greek actress
Kostas Vasileiadis (born 1984), Greek basketball player
Sebastian Vasiliadis, Greek-German footballer
Spyridon Vassiliadis (1845–1877), Greek poet and playwright
Yiannis Vasiliadis (1924–2012), Greek politician and naval admiral

Greek-language surnames
Surnames
Patronymic surnames
Surnames from given names